The Slovenia national under-21 football team is the national under-21 football team of Slovenia and is controlled by the Football Association of Slovenia.

Players

Current squad
The following players were called up for the friendly matches against Slovakia and Azerbaijan on 22 and 26 March 2023, respectively.

Caps and goals are correct as of 21 November 2022, after the match against Bulgaria.

Competitive record

UEFA European Under-21 Championship record

Managers

References

External links
 Under-21 team at NZS 

Under-21
European national under-21 association football teams
Football, Under-21